Standish may refer to:

Places

England
 Standish, Greater Manchester, a village in the Metropolitan Borough of Wigan
 Standish Hall, a demolished estate and country house
 Standish-with-Langtree, a former urban district of Lancashire
 Standish, Gloucestershire

United States
 Standish, California
 Standish Hall (Standish, California), a historic building
 Standish, Maine, a town
 Standish (CDP), Maine, a village in the town
 Standish, Michigan
 Standish Township, Michigan
 Standish, Minneapolis, Minnesota, a neighborhood
 Standish, Missouri

People
 Standish (surname), a list of people and fictional characters with the name
 Standish baronets
 Standish family, 13th- to 20th-century Lords of the Manor in the Manchester, England, locality

Other uses
 Standish Group, an American IT consulting company
 USS Standish (1864), an iron-hulled screw tug